Violet Moore Higgins (November 28, 1886—July 28, 1967), who also published under the name Violet Moore, was an American cartoonist, children's book illustrator, and writer.

Life and career
Violet Idelle Moore was born in Elgin, Illinois on November 28, 1886. She graduated from Elgin High School, a public high school, in 1905. In the early 1900s, she attended the Art Institute of Chicago. 

In 1910, she married artist Edward Robert Higgins, who was an art director for the Newspaper Enterprise Artists Services (NEA) of Scripps-Howard. They had a son, Lindley Roberts Higgins. They had a daughter named Mary Elizabeth Higgins in 1912, who died at one year old in 1913.

In 1913, Higgins painted a cover for the Saturday Evening Post that focused on the United States women's suffrage movement. Around the mid-1910s, she created a series of books for the Whitman Publishing Co. under the name "Story Time Tales". The books contained retellings of traditional stories from different areas of the world.

By the 1920s, Higgins worked for newspapers as a journalist. She interviewed and wrote articles about celebrities, and wrote and illustrated for the NEA along with her husband.

Higgins was also the illustrator of the comic strip "Drowsy Dick", first published in the Sunday World. The comic was originally illustrated by Ernest J. King, but after less than a month, the strip was taken over by Higgins. Her first comic of "Drowsy Dick" was published on October 10, 1926. The cartoon was later dropped from the newspaper when they lowered their number of comic pages. In the 1920s, after readers asked about the comic's absence, the comic was brought back and published in the New York World. Between 1926 and 1927, she additionally was an illustrator for the comic book, Treasure Chest.

From 1954 to 1963, she was a feature writer and illustrator for the Associated Press, with an illustrated children's feature named "Junior Editors". "Junior Editors" started in 1954 and was meant to capture children's attention during the competing rise of magazines and television. The feature ran six times a week and included text and a do-it-yourself section for children.

Higgins died at age 80 on July 28, 1967 in New York City. At the time of her death, she lived in The Bronx.

Gallery

Works
Picture Puzzle Nursery Rhymes (1917)
The Real Story of a Real Doll (1929)
The Gingerbread Man

Story Time Tales
The Endless Story and Other Oriental Tales Retold (1916)
The Little Juggler and Other French Tales Retold (1917)
The Silver Ship and Other Japanese Tales Retold (1917)
The Woodcutter's Son and Other Old English Tales Retold (1917)
The Lost Giant and Other American Indian Tales Retold (1918)
The Carved Shoes and Other Holland Tales (c. 1918)

Illustrations
Zip: The Adventures of a Frisky Fox Terrier (c. 1917) by Frances Trego Montgomery
Delightful Stories for Children (1920) by Elizabeth Billings Stuart; illustrated by Higgins and C. M. Burd
Children's Games for all Seasons (c. 1921) by Teresa M. Bruck; illustrated by Higgins and C. M. Burd
Good-Night Stories (c. 1921) by Laura Rountree Smith; illustrated by Higgins and C. M. Burd
Heidi (c. 1924) by Johanna Heusser Spyri; translation by Mabel Abbott
Homespun Stories: The Wonder Book of Fanciful Tales (c. 1924) by Clara Janetta Fort Denton
East O' the Sun and West O' the Moon With Other Norwegian Folk Tales (c. 1924) by Peter Christen Asbjornsen and Jorgen Engebretsen Moe; retelling by Inger Margrete Rasmussen
The Open Door Primer and The Open Door First Reader (1926) by Elma A. Neal
Pinocchio: The Story of a Puppet (c. 1926) by Carlo Collodi; edited by Higgins
The Story-A-Day Book (1927) by Nelle A. Holt
Denton's Fanciful Tales: Homespun and Cozy Corner Stories (c. 1927) by Clara Janetta Fort Denton; illustrated by Higgins and J. T. Cochran
The Little Lame Prince (c. 1927) by Dinah Maria Mulock Craik
The Dawn of Faith: A Story of Young Missionaries and Pirates in Tripoli (c. 1928) by Zelia Margaret Walters
Hans Brinker: Or, The Silver Skates (1929 edition), written by Mary Mapes Dodge in 1865
The Singing Twins (1930) by Laura Rountree Smith
Our Book World: In the Workshop (c. 1931) by Florence Piper Tuttle; illustrated by Higgins and Mabel Betsy Hill
What Happened After by Patten Beard

References

External links
Saturday Evening Post cover illustration

1886 births
1967 deaths
American women illustrators
American children's book illustrators
20th-century American journalists
American children's writers
American women children's writers
20th-century illustrators of fairy tales
American cartoonists
American women cartoonists
American comic strip cartoonists